This article is a list of riders who have ridden for what is now the . The team began in 1980 as Team Reynolds.

Reynolds (1980–1989)
Miguel Acha
Dominique Arnaud
Juan Maria Azcarate
Gert Frank
Anastasio Greciano
Vicente Iza
José Luis Laguía
Ángel López Del Alamo
Francisco Javier López Izcue
Juan Martín Ocaña
Hector-Raoul Rondan
Jesus Maria Segura
Carlos Hernández Bailo
Jesús Hernández Úbeda
Luis Vicente Otin
Juan-Jose Quintanilla
Ricardo Zúñiga
Ángel Arroyo
Pedro Delgado
Eulalio García
Julián Gorospe
Rafael Ladrón
Imanol Murga
Jesús Suárez Cueva
Enrique Aja
José Luis Jaimerena
Celestino Prieto
Francis Vermaelen
Jaime Vilamajó
Guillermo Arenas
Alvaro Fernandez Fernandez
Iñaki Gastón
Eduardo González Salvador
Miguel Induráin
Eduardo Chozas
Francisco Navarro Fuster
Rolando Ovando
Samuel Cabrera
José Enrique Carrera Alvarez
Marc Gomez
Rubén Gorospe
Stéphane Guay
Kari Myyryläinen
Franck Pineau
Pedro Luis Diaz Zabala
Herminio Díaz Zabala
Melcior Mauri
Ángel Ocaña
José Fernando Pacheco (cyclist)
Gabriel Roberto Sabbaio
Omar Hernández
Luis Javier Lukin
William Palacio
Jesús Rodríguez Magro
Armand de Las Cuevas
Juan Carlos González Salvador
Victor Gonzalo Guiaro

Riders who rode as Reynolds and then Banesto
Dominique Arnaud
José Enrique Carrera Alvarez
Armand de Las Cuevas
Pedro Delgado
Jose Fernando Pacheco
Juan Carlos González Salvador
Victor Gonzalo Guiaro
Julián Gorospe
Rubén Gorospe
Miguel Induráin
Luis Javier Lukin
Jesús Rodríguez Magro
Melcior Mauri

Banesto (1990–2003)
Marino Alonso
Aitor Garmendia
Jesus-Cruz Martin Perez
Juan Martínez Oliver
Jokin Mújika
José Ramón Uriarte
Abelardo Rondón
Francisco Ignacio San Román
Jose Luis Santamaria Gonzalez
Jean-François Bernard
Fabian Fuchs
Prudencio Induráin
Javier Lazpiur
Roberto Lezaun
José Luis De Santos Arribas
Fabrice Philipot
José María Jiménez
José Luis Arrieta
Oscar Lopez Uriarte
Gérard Rué
Vicente Aparicio
Ángel Luis Casero
Santiago Crespo
David García Marquina
Ramón González Arrieta
Stéphane Heulot
Antonio Martín Velasco
Carmelo Miranda
Jesús Montoya
Erwin Nijboer
Juan Antonio Zarrabeitia
Mikel Zarrabeitia
Santiago Blanco
Thomas Davy
José Vicente García Acosta
Andrew Hampsten
Jeremy Hunt
Damien Nazon
Orlando Sergio Rodrigues
Miguel Ángel Peña Caceres
Manuel Beltrán
Manuel Fernández Ginés
Abraham Olano
Aitor Osa
Unai Osa
Cândido Barbosa
David Latasa
Francisco Mancebo
David Navas Chica
Jon Odrioloza
César Solaun
Dariusz Baranowski
Marzio Bruseghin
Leonardo Piepoli
Alex Zülle
Alberto Benito Guerrero
Tomasz Brożyna
Denis Menchov
Xabier Zandio
Eladio Jiménez Sánchez
Juan Carlos Domínguez
Adolfo Garcia
Koldo Gil
Patxi Vila
Juan Miguel Mercado
Juan Antonio Flecha
Ivan Gutiérrez
Rubén Plaza
Javier Pascal Rodriguez
Vladimir Karpets
José Antonio López Gil
Rafael Mateos

Riders who rode as Banesto who then rode as Illes Balears
José Vicente García Acosta
Ivan Gutiérrez
Vladimir Karpets
José Antonio López Gil
José Luis Arrieta
Francisco Mancebo
Denis Menchov
David Navas
Unai Osa
Aitor Osa
Xabier Zandio

Illes Balears (2004–2005)
Daniel Becke
Antonio Colom
Isaac Gálvez
Joan Horrach
Mikel Pradera
Steffen Radochla
Vicente Reynés
Toni Tauler
David Arroyo
José Luis Carrasco
Sergio Escobar
Jonathan Gonzalez Rios
José Julia
Iker Leonet
Francisco Pérez Sanchez

Riders who rode as Banesto, then Illes Balears and then Caisse d'Epargne
José Vicente García Acosta
Ivan Gutiérrez
Vladimir Karpets
Xabier Zandio

Riders who rode as Banesto and then returned under the Caisse d'Epargne name
Rubén Plaza
Marzio Bruseghin

Riders who rode as Illes Balears and then rode as Caisse d'Epargne
José Vicente García Acosta
Ivan Gutiérrez
Vladimir Karpets
Xabier Zandio
José Luis Carrasco
David Arroyo
Antonio Colom
Isaac Gálvez
Joan Horrach
José Julia
Iker Leonet
Francisco Pérez Sanchez
Mikel Pradera
Vicente Reynés

Caisse d'Epargne (2006–2010)
Éric Berthou
Florent Brard
Vladimir Efimkin
Marco Fertonani
Alexei Markov
Óscar Pereiro
Aitor Pérez
Mathieu Perget
Nicolas Portal
Joaquim Rodríguez
Constantino Zaballa
David López García
Alberto Losada
Luis León Sánchez
Anthony Charteau
Arnaud Coyot
Mathieu Drujon
Daniel Moreno
Luis Pasamontes
Fabrice Pantanchon
Marlon Pérez Arango
José Humberto Rujano
Rigoberto Urán
Rui Costa
Arnold Jeannesson
Vasil Kiryienka
Ángel Madrazo
Juan José Cobo
Christophe Moreau
Juan Mauricio Soler

Riders who rode as Banesto, then Illes Balears, then Caisse d'Epargne and then Movistar
José Vicente García Acosta
Ivan Gutiérrez
Vladimir Karpets

Riders who rode as Illes Baleras, then Caisse D'Epargne and then Movistar
José Vicente García Acosta
Ivan Gutiérrez
Vladimir Karpets
David Arroyo
Francisco Pérez Sanchez

Riders who rode as Banesto, returned as Caisse D'Epargne and then as Movistar
Rubén Plaza
Marzio Bruseghin

Riders who rode as Caisse D'Epargne and then Movistar
David Arroyo
Marzio Bruseghin
Rui Costa
José Vicente García Acosta
Ivan Gutiérrez
Vasil Kiryienka
David Lopez
Angel Madrazo
Luis Pasamontes
Francisco Pérez Sanchez
Rubén Plaza
Juan Mauricio Soler
Vladimir Karpets
Juan José Cobo
Andrey Amador

Movistar Team (2011-)
Javier Iriarte
Ignatas Konovalovas
Carlos Oyarzun
Sergio Pardilla
Branislau Samoilau
Xavier Tondo
Argiro Ospina
Eloy Tereul
Sylwester Szmyd
Jonathan Castroviejo
Nairo Quintana
Richard Carapaz
Miguel Ángel López (cyclist)

Movistar Team (men's team)